Childism can refer either to advocacy for empowering children as a subjugated group or to prejudice and/or discrimination against children or childlike qualities. It can operate thus both as a positive term for a movement, like the term feminism, as well as a critical term to identify a phenomenon, like the term racism. The latter concept is more commonly referred to as ageism, adultism or patriarchy. The concept is first described and explored in an article by Chester M. Pierce and Gail B. Allen in 1975. It was used in time in the 1990s in literary theory by Peter Hunt to refer to "to read as children." An extensive treatment of childism as a negative phenomenon is found in Elisabeth Young-Bruehl's last work, published posthumously, Childism: Confronting Prejudice Against Children. 

In the field of childhood studies, and most commonly in Europe, childism is a positive phenomenon based on John Wall's work since 2006 and book, Ethics in Light of Childhood. Recently, the Childism Institute has been formed at Rutgers University Camden, US, holding its inaugural meeting on 11 June 2020. The Childism Institute is a network of international researchers and advocates devoted to "empowering children by critiquing [adultist] norms and structures". Among other things, the Childism Institute maintains a database of research which either employs the concept of childism or is in close alignment with it.

References

Childhood
Children's rights
Youth rights
Ageism
1975 neologisms